Dmitry Vladimirovich Debelka (7 January 1976 – February 2022) was a Belarusian wrestler who competed in the Men's Greco-Roman 130 kg at the 2000 Summer Olympics and won the bronze medal. 

Debelka died in February 2022, at the age of 46.

References

External links

Sports Reference

1976 births
2022 deaths
Sportspeople from Minsk
Olympic wrestlers of Belarus
Wrestlers at the 2000 Summer Olympics
Belarusian male sport wrestlers
Olympic bronze medalists for Belarus
Olympic medalists in wrestling
Medalists at the 2000 Summer Olympics
21st-century Belarusian people
20th-century Belarusian people